The Ceres Brewery was a beer and soft drink producing facility in Århus, Denmark, that operated from 1856 until 2008. Although the brewery was closed by its owner Royal Unibrew the Ceres brand continues, with the product brewed at other facilities. The area where the brewery stood is being redeveloped for residential and commercial use and has been named CeresByen (Ceres City).

History

"Ceres Brewery" was founded in 1856 by Malthe Conrad Lottrup, a grocer, with chemists "A. S. Aagard" and "Knud Redelien", as the city's seventh brewery. It was named after the Roman goddess Ceres, and its opening was announced in the local newspaper, Århus Stiftstidende. 

Lottrup expanded the brewery after ten years, adding a grand new building as his private residence.

He was succeeded by his son-in-law, Laurits Christian Meulengracht, who ran the brewery for almost thirty years, expanding it further before selling it to "Østjyske Bryggerier", another brewing firm.

The Ceres brewery was named an official purveyor to the "Royal Danish Court" in 1914.

References

External links 

 Ceres Brewery

Royal Unibrew subsidiaries

Breweries in Denmark
Danish brands
Danish companies established in 1856
Purveyors to the Court of Denmark
Companies based in Aarhus
Food and drink companies established in 1856